Jozef Marie Aloys Janssens de Varebeke (29 May 1854, Sint-Niklaas - 29 June 1930, Antwerp) was a Belgian painter; known for his portraits and religious works.

Biography 

He was the eldest child of the industrialist and politician, and his wife Marie-Angélique, née Beeckman (1834–1889). His father drew as a hobby, and numbered several artists among his friends, including Jan Swerts and Godfried Guffens. After graduating from the gymnasium in his hometown, he worked in his father's factory, then attended the Jesuit college in Bergen. During this time, he also took drawing lessons from Swerts.In 1872, when his father received a visit from Franz Ittenbach and Karl Müller, two painters from Düsseldorf, they saw Jozef's drawings and recommended that he undertake formal studies.

These were begun with Ittenbach, at his studio in Düsseldorf. He worked there until late 1874. He also took professional advice from the religious artist, Ernst Deger. Later, he worked with Guffens in Brussels. In 1876, he went to Rome where, thanks to a recommendation from Ittenbach, he was able to study with Ludovico Seitz.

In 1880, he completed his studies there, and returned to Antwerp; establishing his own studio in 1884. He was married there, to Marie Lucie, née Hye-Hoys (1866–1950), and they had eight children.

In addition to his canvases, from 1890 to 1910 he provided decorative paintings for the Jesuit church in Leuven, the Beguine monastery in Ghent and the Maredsous Abbey in Namur, as well as the Cathedral of Our Lady in Antwerp. Many of his portraits were of clergymen; notably Popes Leo XIII and Pius X, the Archbishop of Mechelen, Désiré-Joseph Mercier, and the Bishop of Ghent, Antoon Stillemans. In 1904, Pius X presented him with the Order of St. Sylvester. 

During World War I, he lived as a refugee in Manchester, where he made his living as a portrait painter. Among his subjects there were the physicist, Ernest Rutherford and his daughter Eileen.

Hs younger brother, Frans, was a Catholic priest and a scientist, involved in genetic research. He is credited with discovering chromosomal crossover.

References

Further reading 
 Guy Janssens de Varebeke: "Un maître du portrait: Joseph Janssens de Varebeke (1854–1930)". In: Le Parchemin, # 415 (May/June 2015), pp.322–328.
 Herman Stynen, De onvoltooid verleden tijd. Een geschiedenis van de monumenten- en landschapszorg in België 1835-1940, Stichting Vlaams Erfgoed, 1998

External links 

 Guy Janssens de Varebeke & Michel Verwilghen, Jozef Janssens, 1854-1930. Peintre de l'art religieux et maître du portrait, 2020  (Online)

1854 births
1930 deaths
Belgian painters
Belgian portrait painters
Religious artists
People from Sint-Niklaas